Dirty Little Rabbits is the debut album by American indie band Dirty Little Rabbits, released in 2010. It was the band's only album. "Hello" was previously released on Breeding and Simon. "Happy" and "You Say" were previously released on Simon.

Critical reception
AllMusic called the album "a debut that’s sometimes rough, often enigmatic, and almost always fun." Rock Sound wrote that "the supremely versatile vocal stylings of Stella K are particularly striking, as she yaps, croaks, yells and croons in equal measure, pushing each distinctly oddball, organ-infused groover relentlessly forward."

Track listing
"Simon" — 3:28
"You Say" — 3:19
"Put It In the Rock" — 3:53
"Hello" — 4:05
"Happy" — 3:29
"I Love You" — 4:17
"Professional Hit" — 4:34
"If" — 3:43
"Leave Me Alone" — 4:04
"The Didn'ts" — 2:39
"Rabbit Holes" — 4:27

Personnel
 Stella Katsoudas – vocals
 Ty Fury – guitars
 Jeff Karnowski – bass
 Michael Pfaff – keyboards, organ
 Shawn Crahan – drums

References

2010 debut albums
Dirty Little Rabbits albums
The End Records albums